Summer league may refer to several sports leagues.

Baseball
Dominican Summer League
Venezuelan Summer League
Collegiate summer baseball

Basketball
NBA Summer League
Summer Pro League

See also
:Category:Summer baseball leagues
:Category:Summer association football leagues